Mihailo "Miki" Ivanović (born 4 February 1952) is a Serbian football manager. He previously worked as a sports journalist.

Career
During his managerial career, Ivanović led numerous clubs in his homeland, including Zemun, Radnički Obrenovac, and Voždovac in the First League of Serbia and Montenegro, as well as Smederevo, OFK Beograd, and Novi Pazar in the Serbian SuperLiga. He also worked professionally in China, Cyprus, Montenegro, and North Korea.

References

External links
 

Doxa Katokopias FC managers
Ethnikos Achna FC managers
Expatriate football managers in China
Expatriate football managers in Cyprus
Expatriate football managers in Montenegro
Expatriate football managers in North Korea
FK Budućnost Podgorica managers
FK Čukarički managers
FK Novi Pazar managers
FK Rad managers
FK Smederevo managers
FK Voždovac managers
FK Zemun managers
OFK Beograd managers
Serbia and Montenegro expatriate football managers
Serbia and Montenegro expatriate sportspeople in China
Serbia and Montenegro expatriate sportspeople in Cyprus
Serbia and Montenegro football managers
Serbian expatriate football managers
Serbian expatriate sportspeople in Montenegro
Serbian expatriate sportspeople in North Korea
Serbian football managers
Serbian journalists
Serbian SuperLiga managers
Sportspeople from Belgrade
1952 births
Living people